

Wireless Philosophy or Wi-Phi is an open-access philosophy website that aims to "introduce people to the practice of philosophy by making videos that are freely available in a form that is entertaining".
Its founder and executive director is Gaurav Vazirani, a PhD student at Yale University.
According to Mel Thompson, Wireless Philosophy is "a very good online resource for those coming new to philosophy, and for students from GCSE upwards."

Notable contributors

 Elizabeth Brake
 Stephen Darwall
 Thomas Donaldson
 Julia Driver
 Sally Haslanger
 Andrew Janiak
 Monte Johnson
 Joshua Knobe
 Karen Lewis

See also
 1000-Word Philosophy

References

External links
 Wireless Philosophy

2013 establishments in the United States
American educational websites
Education-related YouTube channels
Open access projects
Philosophy education
Philosophy websites